Unofficial South American Championships in Athletics (V Campeonato Extraordinario de Atletismo) were held in La Paz, Bolivia in October 1948.  The event was held in celebration of the 400th anniversary of the foundation of the city of La Paz.  The games were dominated by Bolivian athlete Julia Iriarte winning five gold, one silver and one bronze medal.

Medal summary
Medal winners are published.

Men

Women

Medal table (unofficial)

References

External links
gbrathletics.com

U 1948
1948 in Bolivian sport
1948 in athletics (track and field)
International athletics competitions hosted by Bolivia
1948 in South American sport